Kastellorizo Island Public Airport is an airport on the small island Kastellorizo, Greece , part of the Dodecanese island group. It is the eastmost airport of Greece.

History
In the beginning of the twentieth century, the island of Kastellorizo was linked by seaplanes to destinations mainly in northeast Africa. The seaplanes used the natural horse-shoe sized harbour of the island. The current Kastellorizo Airport first began operations in 1986 as a domestic airport. The airport has a  small terminal of 150 m2 and the apron can accommodate one Bombardier Dash 8 sized aircraft and 3 light general aviation aircraft.

Airlines and destinations
The following airlines operate regular scheduled and charter flights at Kastellorizo Airport:

Statistics

Annual passenger statistics history

Ground transport
The facility is located more or less on the middle of the island, about 2.5 km southwest of the city Megisti. The airport is linked to the city by a single bus only during the summer period. Taxis are also available.

See also
Transport in Greece

References

External links
Greek-Airports.gr page
HCAA-eleng page
HCAA page
LGKJ Airport Statistics

Airports in Greece
Kastellorizo
Buildings and structures in the South Aegean